William A. Kay (February 22, 1864 – November 27, 1931) was an American farmer and politician.

Born in Martell, Wisconsin, Kay was a farmer and served in town government. He served in the Wisconsin State Assembly in 1909, 1911, 1915, and 1931 as a Republican. He died in Madison, Wisconsin while still in office.

Notes

1864 births
1931 deaths
People from Pierce County, Wisconsin
Republican Party members of the Wisconsin State Assembly